Shamim Sarif (born 24 September 1969) is a British novelist and filmmaker of South Asian and South African heritage. Her work often focuses on various aspects of identity including gender, race, and sexuality. It often draws upon her own personal experience with cross cultural, non-heterosexual love.

Early life and education
Sarif was born in London, England, to Indian parents who had left South Africa in the early 1960s to escape apartheid. She studied English literature at the University of London, then took a Master's in English at Boston University.

Career
Sarif's  fifth feature film, indie drama Polarized, was shot in Manitoba. Her previous feature films as a writer and director, all based on her novels, have won 47 awards between them. Titles include The World Unseen (2001), (selected for TIFF) and Despite the Falling Snow (starring Rebecca Ferguson and Charles Dance). Her debut feature I Can't Think Straight earned her a notice from the Los Angeles Times as a "filmmaker of exceptional promise".

Moonshine (eOne) Diggstown (CBC/Fox) and SkyMed (Paramount Plus). Her latest books, The Shadow Mission and The Athena Protocol (HarperCollins) are being developed as a series with Village Roadshow and Gran Via Productions.

Sarif has spoken at TED events worldwide, at the INK Conference in India and DLD in Munich. Corporate speaking events have included Deloitte, Goldman Sachs, Citibank and Disney.

Shamim was invited to join the Academy of Motion Picture Arts and Sciences in 2019. She is also a member of BAFTA, the WGA, the Directors Guild of Canada and the Canadian Media Producers Association.

In January 2001, Sarif co-founded a multi-media entertainment company based in London and in partnership between her spouse, producer Hanan Kattan, called Enlightenment Productions.

Her roots inspired her to write her debut novel, The World Unseen (2001), which explores issues of race, gender and sexuality, which she later adapted into a film starring Lisa Ray and Sheetal Sheth. It was heavily inspired by the stories of Sarif's grandmother and the family's Indian and South African heritage.

She has also adapted and directed a film based on her book I Can't Think Straight.

Her 2011 film The House of Tomorrow is a documentary about the 2010 TEDx Holy Land Conference, which brought together Arab and Israeli women to discuss issues of mutual interest in technology, entertainment, and design.

Awards and nominations 
 Her debut novel, The World Unseen (2001), won the Pendleton May First Novel Award and a Betty Trask Award.
The World Unseen won the Authence Award at the Miami Gay & Lesbian film festival in 2008, and the Best Feature Film award at the Paris Lesbian and Feminist Film Festival
 I Can't Think Straight won the Authence Award at the Miami Gay & Lesbian film festival in 2009
 She is the recipient of Best Director awards for The World Unseen film from the South African Film and Television Awards, the Phoenix Film Festival and the Clip (Tampa) Festival.
 The House of Tomorrow, winner of Documentary Audience Award at the Festival Regards Sur Le Cinema Du Monde 2014 in Rouen (France)
 Despite The Falling Snow has won 13 awards to date including 3 at Milan International Film Festival, 3 at Prague International Film Festival, and others at Canada, Buffalo Niagara, Soho, Manchester and Orlando International Film Festivals
 Enlightenment Productions were Winner of the Kingston Business Excellence Awards 2014, Best Creative and Media Sector Business.

Personal life 
Sarif's background was in her family's financial business for 10 years before becoming a full-time novelist and film director.

Sarif, who claims Muslim origins, is openly lesbian and described I Can't Think Straight to be semi-autobiographical. She has stated that Jeanette Winterson's The Passion is one of her favorite books.

On 23 September 2015, she married producer Hanan Kattan in London after being together for nearly 20 years.  They have two sons, Ethan (b. 1999) and Luca (b. 2002).

Filmography

Bibliography
The World Unseen (2001)
Despite the Falling Snow (2004)
I Can't Think Staight (2008)
The Athena Control (2020)
The Shadow Mission (2020)

See also 
 List of Indian women film directors
 List of Indian women screenwriters
 List of female film and television directors
 List of lesbian filmmakers
 List of LGBT-related films directed by women

References

Further reading

 
 Producers Lab Toronto unveils 2015 line-up
 Shamim Sarif's Top 10 Film To Book Adaptations
 Exclusive: Go Behind the Scenes of 'Despite The Falling Snow' in new Featurette

External links
 
 Official website

1969 births
21st-century English novelists
21st-century English women writers
English film directors
English women film directors
Living people
English lesbian writers
LGBT film directors
English LGBT novelists
British LGBT screenwriters
English women novelists
Writers from London
English people of Indian descent
English people of South African descent
Alumni of the University of London
Boston University College of Arts and Sciences alumni
21st-century British screenwriters